The 2010–11 New Zealand one-day competition is the 40th season of official List A domestic cricket in New Zealand. This year there is no sponsor for the one day competition. The season began on 9 January 2010 with Otago Volts playing Wellington Firebirds, Auckland Aces playing Northern Districts Knights and Central Districts Stags playing Canterbury Wizards.

Points table

Teams

Playoffs

New Zealand Cricket uses the Page playoff system for its one-day competition.

Round One

Major Semi Final

Auckland were in cruise control needing 269 to win after being 119/1 in  the 17th over. However, after both Lou Vincent and Jeet Raval fell, good bowling by Canterbury and a batting collapse by Auckland propelled Canterbury directly into the final.

Minor Semi Final

Through several handy innings Northern Districts posted a good 271/8. Otago started their chase poorly falling to 80/5 in the 19th over. However, Darren Broom and Derek de Boorder put on 165 runs for the 6th wicket a partnership record for Otago . This partnership meant that when the game was finally called off for rain after 46 overs, Otago was ahead of their target by nine runs. Northern were eliminated and Otago went into the elimination semi final.

Statistics

Most Runs

Most Wickets

Last Updated 24 January 2011

Team of the Season

See also

Plunket Shield
New Zealand limited-overs cricket trophy
State Twenty20

New Zealand one-day cricket competition season
One-day Cricket Competition Season, 2010-11
Ford Trophy